Interstate 395 may refer to:
Interstate 395 (Connecticut–Massachusetts), a spur from I-95 to Auburn, Massachusetts
Interstate 395 (Delaware), a proposed portion of I-95 in Delaware, when it was under construction
Interstate 395 (Florida), a spur in Miami, Florida
Interstate 395 (Maine), a spur in Bangor, Maine
Interstate 395 (Maryland), a spur in Baltimore, Maryland
Interstate 395 (Pennsylvania), a loop through Philadelphia, Pennsylvania, currently designated as part of Interstate 76
Interstate 395 (Virginia–District of Columbia), a spur from I-95 to Washington, D.C.

95-3
3